Tung Tao-yun was a Chinese educator and politician. She was among the first group of women elected to the Legislative Yuan in 1948.

Biography
Tung attended National Southeast University, where she graduated from the Department of Education. She became headteacher of Boxian County Middle School in Anhui province and was an inspector for the Shaanxi province Department of Education. She also qualified as a lawyer. A graduate of the Kuomintang's , she became secretary of the party's central department and served on Shanghai City Council.

Tung was a Kuomintang candidate in Anhui in the 1948 elections for the Legislative Yuan, and was elected to parliament, relocating to Taiwan during the Chinese Civil War. She served as executive director of Chinese Muslim Association and of the Taipei Mosque Board.

References

Hui people
Chinese schoolteachers
20th-century Chinese lawyers
Members of the Kuomintang
20th-century Chinese women politicians
Members of the 1st Legislative Yuan
Members of the 1st Legislative Yuan in Taiwan